Dinesh Hingoo (born 13 April 1940) is an Indian actor who plays comic & supporting roles in Hindi films. He had appeared in over 300 films, from Taqdeer (1967) to Be Careful (2011), and is known for his laughter and impersonations including that of a Parsi businessman.

He was a stand-up comedian in many orchestras, famous comedian Johny Lever in an interview stated that it was Dinesh Hingoo, who gave him a break to perform on stage as a comedian.

He had played supporting roles and bit parts in movies such as Qurbani, Saajan, Baazigar, Humraaz, Daraar, No Entry, Judaai, Khoobsurat, Hera Pheri (2000 film), Phir Hera Pheri and  Anubhav. He had acted in television serials on Indian public broadcaster, Doordarshan. He is known for his character as Chaman Jhinga in Hera Pheri.

Filmography

References

External links

Indian male film actors
Living people
1940 births